The 2022–2023 National Health Service (NHS) strikes are ongoing industrial disputes in the publicly funded health services of the United Kingdom.

Nurses strikes
The disputes commenced on 6 October 2022, when the Royal College of Nursing (RCN) announced their intention to ballot members for industrial action for the first time in their 106-year history in a dispute over a pay rise offer which is less than the 5% above inflation which the trade union says nurses should get. Subsequently, Unison announced that they would ballot their members for solidarity industrial action across the wider publicly funded health services. On 10 November, nurses and other medical personnel across the NHS voted to strike, under the Royal College of Nursing. The nurses stated this was due to failing wages, inflation, overwork, and underfunding caused by the UK cost of living crisis.

Strike dates were announced at midnight on 25 November, with RCN members scheduled to engage in strike action between 08:00 and 20:00 on 15 and 20 December. The Unison solidarity ballot for industrial action is ongoing. Strikes are also scheduled on 18 and 19 January 2023. On 16 January 2023, the Royal College of Nursing announced a further two strike days for England and Wales on 6 and 7 February, which were described as being the biggest so far.

General Secretary of the RCN Pat Cullen has called on the UK government to open negotiations.

Responses
Prime Minister Rishi Sunak said that the pay offer to nurses was "appropriate and fair". The Times reported on 8 December that Sunak was preparing to restrict the rights of NHS workers to strike, including proposals to ban ambulance workers and paramedics from striking.

Jake Berry (the former Chairman of the Conservative Party), Dan Poulter (a former minister in the Department of Health), and Robert Buckland (the former Justice Secretary) called on Sunak to negotiate with unions.

In Prime Minister's Questions on 14 December, Leader of the Opposition Keir Starmer said that the NHS strikes were "a badge of shame" for the government and that Sunak was in "hibernation" instead of trying to avert the disruption. Wes Streeting, the Shadow Secretary of State for Health and Social Care, said that a Labour government would "take on" health unions which were "hostile", but would be prepared to negotiate pay increases.

Eluned Morgan, the Minister for Health and Social Services in the Welsh government, said she was "saddened" by the NHS strikes but that the Welsh government could not increase their pay offer without "substantial cuts to staffing and essential services" or an increase in investment from Westminster.

On 14–16 December 2022 a poll for The Observer by Opinium found 60% of voters said they supported nurses going on strike, with 29% opposing the strikes.

Ambulance worker strikes
On 30 November, the GMB announced that more than 10,000 ambulance workers had voted to strike in nine NHS trusts across England and Wales. The ambulance service trusts effected are the South Western Ambulance Service, the South East Coast Ambulance Service, the North West Ambulance Service, the South Central Ambulance Service, the North East Ambulance Service, the East Midlands Ambulance Service, the West Midlands Ambulance Service, the Welsh Ambulance Service, and the Yorkshire Ambulance Service. The union called two 24-hour strikes on 21 and 28 December. 

UNISON members at ambulance services in London, Yorkshire, the North West, the North East, and the South West also are to go on strike on 21 December, from noon until midnight. Unite the Union announced that over 1,600 of its workers in ambulance services in the West Midlands, the North West, and the North East would walk out on 21 December after workers voted by up to 92% for strike action.

Last-minute talks on 20 December between Health Secretary Steve Barclay and union leaders fell through after the government refused to make a new pay offer.

The GMB strikes planned for 28 December were called off on 23 December due to the "amazing public support" and to avoid causing "any additional anxiety" over Christmas. The strike was rescheduled for 11 January 2023.

On 18 January 2023, the GMB announced a further four strike days in February, including 6 February, a date that will coincide with one of the nurses strikes, creating the largest strike within the NHS so far.

Responses
Will Quince, the Minister of State for Health, advised against "risky activity" or participating in contact sports during the strike. Stephen Powis, the national medical director of NHS England, asked people to only ring 999 in life-threatening emergencies and to take "sensible steps to keep themselves and others safe", including drinking responsibly and checking up on vulnerable family members and neighbours.

Manchester United decided to reduce capacity at Old Trafford by 12,000 for their Carabao Cup match against Burnley F.C. due to the strike. The matches between Newcastle United and AFC Bournemouth and between Southampton F.C. and Lincoln City had already been rescheduled to 20 December because of the strikes.

Doctor strikes 
During 2022 the British Medical Association (BMA) announced a demand of pay increases to restore junior doctors' pay to match the real term pay levels of 2008. According to the union, repeated pay freezes and pay-increases below the inflation level had resulted in real-term pay cuts of nearly 30% for junior doctors since 2008. The BMA organized a strike ballot, the result of which was announced on 20 February 2023. More than 98% of respondents supported strike action, and the BMA subsequently announced a 72 hour strike starting 13 March.

Scottish pay offer
NHS workers in Scotland were given an average 7.5% pay offer by the Scottish government, resulting in unions in Scotland suspending their strikes. Humza Yousaf, the Cabinet Secretary for Health and Social Care, said that the proposal was the "best and final pay offer" available and that there was "nothing left in the coffers" to improve it further. The RCN, Royal College of Midwives (RCM), the Chartered Society of Physiotherapy (CSP), Unite, Unison and the GMB launched consultative members ballots on the offer.

Unite members accepted the pay deal, with 64% voting in favour. Sharon Graham, Unite general secretary, said that the improved pay result was "a testament to the resolve of our members". Unison members voted by 57% to accept the offer on a turnout of 63%. Yousaf said that he was "delighted" that Unite and Unison members had accepted the offer. The CSP also voted to accept the deal, with 72% of members in favour.

The RCN did not give a recommendation on whether members should accept or reject the offer, but said that it was still "below our expectations". 82% of RCN members who voted rejected the pay offer. Two thirds of GMB members voted to reject the offer. The RCM announced on 21 December that 65% of its members had voted against the pay offer. Jaki Lambert, the RCM director for Scotland, said following the vote that the offer was "simply not good enough" and that members were "prepared to take industrial action" to get a better deal.

Consequently, the RCN, the RCM and the GMB union rejected the pay offer and Unite and Unison accepted it. The Scottish government decided to go ahead with its existing pay offer after Yousaf met with union leaders on 23 December. Yousaf said that he would "do everything [he could]" to avert strikes but that there was no more money to increase the offer.

The Scotsman reported on 27 December that a Savanta poll it had commissioned between 16 and 21 December showed that 66% of respondents would support nurses striking, compared to 23% in opposition.

See also

 2015 junior doctors contract dispute in England
 United Kingdom cost of living crisis
 COVID-19 protests in the United Kingdom, which included some NHS worker protests
 Timeline of strikes in 2022

References

2022 labor disputes and strikes
2023 labor disputes and strikes
October 2022 events in the United Kingdom
November 2022 events in the United Kingdom
December 2022 events in the United Kingdom
January 2023 events in the United Kingdom
Healthcare in the United Kingdom
Labour disputes in England
Health and medical strikes
Ambulance services in the United Kingdom
Royal College of Nursing
Boris Johnson
Liz Truss
Rishi Sunak